Ishizuka (written: 石塚 or いしづか in hiragana, lit. "stone mound") is a Japanese surname. Notable people with the surname include:

, Japanese anime director
, Japanese voice actor
, Japanese footballer
, Japanese voice actress
, Japanese physician
, Japanese voice actress
, Japanese poet and writer
, Japanese musician
, Japanese voice actor
Yukio Ishizuka (born 1938), Japanese psychiatrist

Japanese-language surnames